The Great Game is a 1953 British sports comedy-drama directed by Maurice Elvey and starring James Hayter, Thora Hird and Diana Dors. It was based on a play by Basil Thomas. Many of the scenes were shot at Griffin Park the home of Brentford F.C. Several professional football players made appearances in the film including Tommy Lawton.

Plot
The chairman of a relegation zone English football club makes an illegal approach to a rising star of a rival club. This is discovered by the football authorities and the Chairman is ultimately suspended from the game following the ensuing scandal.

Cast
 James Hayter – Joe Lawson
 Thora Hird – Miss Rawlings
 Diana Dors – Lulu Smith
 John Laurie – 'Mac' Wells
 Meredith Edwards – Skid Evans
 Jack Lambert – Ralph Blake
 Glyn Houston – Ned Rutter
 Geoffrey Toone – Jack Bannerman
 Alexander Gauge – Ben Woodhall
 Frank Pettingell – Sir Julius
 Tommy Lawton – Cameo
 Sheila Shand-Gibbs – Mavis Pink

Original play
The film was based on a play "Shooting Star" by Basil Thomas which premiered in 1949. Thomas was a football fan who decided to write a play about the transfer system. He says managers and directors were keen to co operate. Among the people Thomas interviewed were Ted Vizard, Stan Cullis and Claude Jephcott.

1949 TV adaptation
The play was filmed for TV in 1949.

Cast
Derek Blomfield as Ned Rutter
 Colin Douglas	as Jack Bannerman
Charmian Eyre as	Mavis Pink
 Raymond Francis as Mr Blake
 Heather Gratrix	as Lulu Smith
    James Hayter	as Joe Lawson
    Avice Landone	as Miss Rawlings
    Cameron Miller	as Wells
    Robert Perceval	aS Ben Woodhall
    Frank Pettitt	as Skid Evans
    Ann Titheradge	as Beryl Armstrong

Production
Film rights were bought by Adelphi who made a number of low budget comedies. They also made Is Your Honeymoon Really Necessary? with Dors.

Critical reception
Picture Show called it an "unpretentious but most enjoyable comedy."

The Monthly Film Bulletin said "the humour is stale".

The Digital Fix found the film "largely insignificant and admittedly musters up little interest, but then it is offset with a gentle humour and plenty of broad comedy characterisation from its supporting cast; nobody could ogle Dors’ sexpot secretary quite like John Laurie does in the opening scene."

References

External links
The Great Game at IMDb
The Great Gam at BFI
The Great Game at Letterbox DVD

1953 films
British sports comedy-drama films
British association football films
1950s English-language films
Films directed by Maurice Elvey
1950s sports comedy-drama films
British black-and-white films
1950s British films